Nick Lah (born 8 May 1981) is an Australian rugby union footballer.  Lah represented the Central Coast Rays in the Australian Rugby Championship. He was the sportsmaster at St Aloysius' College (Sydney) until 2022.

Footnotes

Australian rugby union players
Rugby union props
Living people
1981 births
Place of birth missing (living people)